Plagiorophus is an extinct genus of prehistoric plagiosaurid. It is known from the Middle Triassic Bukobay Formation (Ladinian) and Donguz Formation (Anisian) of Russia.

See also 
 Prehistoric amphibian
 List of prehistoric amphibians

References 

Stereospondyls
Triassic amphibians of Europe
Anisian genera
Ladinian genera
Triassic Russia
Fossils of Russia
Fossil taxa described in 1955